Keith Downes Young (12 September 1848 - 1 December 1929) was an English architect best known for designing hospitals and school sanatoria.

Biography
Young was born in King's Road, Richmond, Surrey on 12 September 1848. He attended Tonbridge School, after which, in 1865, he was articled to his father, George Adam Young. He studied at South Kensington School of Art and the Architectural Association.

He commenced independent practice in London in 1871 and entered into partnership with his father the following year. By 1886 he had entered into partnership with the church architect, Henry Hall, and their practice acquired a reputation for designing hospitals and school sanatoria.

Young practiced for over fifty years, advising on approximately forty hospitals, either as new buildings or alterations, including the Middlesex Hospital, the Royal Eye Hospital, the Hospital for Epilepsy and Paralysis, the Chelsea Hospital for Women and Guy's Hospital Medical School.

He died on 1 December 1929 and was buried on the eastern side of Highgate Cemetery.

Selected works
Hospitals:
 Derbyshire Royal Infirmary, Derby
 Royal Eye Hospital, Southwark
 Victoria Hospital for Children, Tite Street, Chelsea
 Evelina Hospital for Children, Southwark
 Royal Dental Hospital, Leicester Square
 East Sussex Hospital, Hastings
 Great Northern Hospital, Holloway
 Hampstead General Hospital, Pond Street, Hampstead
 Bolingbroke Hospital, Battersea
 Chelsea Hospital for Women, Dovehouse Street
 Ear, Nose and Throat Hospital, Gray's Inn Road
 Maida Vale Hospital, Maida Vale
 Chest Hospital, Putney
 Miller Hospital, Greenwich
 Middlesex Hospital, Marylebone

School Sanatoria:
 Harrow School, Harrow
 Clifton College, Bristol
 Shrewsbury School, Shrewsbury
 Sherborne School, Dorset
 Blundell's School, Tiverton

Other works:
 Evening Standard Building, Shoe Lane, City of London
 Dunsley Hall, near Whitby, North Yorkshire
 Extension to Royal College of Surgeons, Lincoln's Inn Fields

Gallery

References

1848 births
1929 deaths
19th-century English architects
20th-century English architects
Architects from London
People educated at Tonbridge School
Burials at Highgate Cemetery
People from Richmond, London